Kenneth D. Peach, Sr. (March 6, 1903 – February 27, 1988) was an American cinematographer.

Biography
Kenneth D. Peach Sr. was born in El Reno, Indian Territory (in what is now Oklahoma). Peach entered the film industry in 1923 and became a director of photography in 1926. He worked with composite processes, miniatures, montages and matte shots for Tiffany Pictures for two years, then joined Fred Jackman's technical effects department at Warner Bros.- First National for three years. In 1931 he joined RKO Pictures' special effects department. In 1933 he began a long association with producer Hal Roach of Hal Roach Studios, where he shot several  Laurel and Hardy films (Dirty Work, Sons of the Desert). In his later career, he worked in both film and television, in TV series such as Lassie (73 episodes, 1958–1960), The Outer Limits (25 episodes, 1964–1965), H.R. Pufnstuf (17 episodes, 1969–1970), Taxi (59 episodes, 1980–1983), before retiring in 1984.

He was married to actress Pauline Curley from 1922 until his death. They had two sons, cinematographer Kenneth Peach, Jr., and Martin Peach, who worked  as a key grip on the Disney television series, Wizards of Waverly Place and a daughter Pauline A. Reynolds.

Peach died on February 27, 1988, eight days before his 85th birthday. He and wife Pauline (who died December 16, 2000) are buried together in the Lincoln Terrace section of Forest Lawn-Hollywood Hills Cemetery in Los Angeles, California.

References

External links

1903 births
1988 deaths
People from El Reno, Oklahoma
American cinematographers
Hal Roach Studios filmmakers
Burials at Forest Lawn Memorial Park (Hollywood Hills)
Film producers from Oklahoma